Piroska Szekrényessy (born 1 May 1916 in Budapest, Hungary; died 30 October 1990 in Budapest) was a Hungarian pair skater who competed with her brother Attila Szekrényessy.  They were six-time gold medalists at the Hungarian Figure Skating Championships.  The pair finished fourth at the 1936 Winter Olympics and won the bronze medal at the European Figure Skating Championships in 1936 and 1937.

Results
(with Attila Szekrényessy)

References
 Sports-Reference profile

1916 births
1990 deaths
Figure skaters from Budapest
Hungarian female pair skaters
Figure skaters at the 1936 Winter Olympics
Olympic figure skaters of Hungary
European Figure Skating Championships medalists